Marion County Courthouse is a historic courthouse located at Hannibal, Marion County, Missouri.  It was built in 1901, and is a two-story, rectangular, Classical Revival style limestone building. It features an octagonal drum dome topped by an octagonal lantern towering above the two-story portico with four Corinthian order columns.

It was added to the National Register of Historic Places in 2002.

References

County courthouses in Missouri
Courthouses on the National Register of Historic Places in Missouri
Neoclassical architecture in Missouri
Government buildings completed in 1901
Buildings and structures in Hannibal, Missouri
National Register of Historic Places in Marion County, Missouri
1901 establishments in Missouri